Iceage is a Danish punk rock band from Copenhagen. The band was formed in 2008 and has released the albums New Brigade (2011), You're Nothing (2013), Plowing Into the Field of Love (2014),  Beyondless (2018), and  Seek Shelter (2021).

History
Iceage were formed in 2008, when the members of the band averaged 17 years old. They signed to Escho to release their debut 7" in 2009 and later on also to Tambourhinoceros in Denmark and Dais Records in the United States.  They were then picked up by What's Your Rupture? Records for international release, and their debut album New Brigade was released in January 2011 in Denmark and on 21 June 2011, in the US.

In February 2013, Iceage released their second studio album, You're Nothing, after signing with the independent record label Matador Records. It earned a four star rating (out of five) from Allmusic and four-and-a-half stars out of five from Humo.

Iceage's third studio album, Plowing Into the Field of Love, was released in October 2014 by Matador. All three albums received a nomination for IMPALA's European Independent Album of the Year Award. Iceage released their fourth album, Beyondless, on 4 May 2018 through Matador.

The band's chief songwriter and lead vocalist, Elias Bender Rønnenfelt, also performs under the name Marching Church and has released two albums: This World Is Not Enough (2015) and Telling It Like It Is (2016).

On 7 May 2021, Iceage released their fifth album Seek Shelter.

Band members
 Elias Bender Rønnenfelt – vocals, guitar (born 24 March 1992)
 Johan Surrballe Wieth – guitar, backing vocals (born 13 September 1991) 
 Jakob Tvilling Pless – bass (born 10 November 1992) 
 Dan Kjær Nielsen – drums (born 11 October 1991) 
 Casper Morilla – guitar (Born 31 March 1985), joined in 2019

Discography
Studio albums
 New Brigade (2011)
 You're Nothing (2013)
 Plowing Into the Field of Love (2014)
 Beyondless (2018)
 Seek Shelter (2021)

Extended plays
 Iceage (2009)
 Lower / Iceage (2013; split)
 To the Comrades (2013)

Singles
 "New Brigade" (2010)
 "Broken Bone" (2011)
 "White Rune" (2011)
 "Ecstasy" (2013)
 "Wounded Hearts" (2013)
 "The Lord's Favorite" (2014)
 "Catch It" (2018)
 "Pain Killer" (2018)
 "Take It All" (2018)
 "The Day the Music Dies" (2018)
 "Hurrah" (2018)
 "Lockdown Blues" (2020)
 "The Holding Hand" (2021)
 "Vendetta" (2021)
Live albums
 Coalition (2011)
 Live, April Fools Day (2014)
 Live 2014 (2015)

References

External links

 

Musical quartets
Danish rock music groups
Danish punk rock groups
Post-punk revival music groups
Noise rock groups
Danish indie rock groups
Matador Records artists
Musical groups established in 2008
Rough Trade Records artists
Dais Records artists